Richard Kearns (1952-2014) was an Irish classical composer.

He was born in 1952 at North Gloucester Place, Dublin, Ireland. He died in 2014.

See also
 Music of Ireland - Irish Composers

References

External links
 Richard Kearns Website
 Richard Kearns Music and Recordings
 Richard Kearns Listing IMSLP
 Richard Kearns Listing Classical Composers

1952 births
Living people
Irish film score composers
Male film score composers
Musicians from County Donegal